This is a list of World Heritage Sites in Tajikistan with properties of cultural and natural heritage in Tajikistan as inscribed in UNESCO's World Heritage List or as on the country's tentative list.

World Heritage Sites 

Site; named after the World Heritage Committee's official designation
Location; at city, regional, or provincial level and geocoordinates
Criteria; as defined by the World Heritage Committee
Area; in hectares and acres. If available, the size of the buffer zone has been noted as well. A value of zero implies that no data has been published by UNESCO
Year; during which the site was inscribed to the World Heritage List
Description; brief information about the site, including reasons for qualifying as an endangered site, if applicable

Tentative list
Mausoleum of Amir Khamza Khasti Podshoh (1999) 
The Site of Ancient Town of Takhti-Sangin (1999) 
The Site of Ancient Town of Baitudasht IV (1999) 
Mausoleum of "Khoja Mashkhad" (1999) 
Buddhistic cloister of Ajina-Tepa (1999) 
Palace of the Governor of Khulbuk (1999) 
Mausoleum of Hodja Nashron (1999) 
The Site of Ancient Town of Pyanjekent (1999) 
Mausoleum of "Mukhammad Bashoro" (1999) 
The Site of Ancient Town of Shahristan (Kahkakha) (1999) 
Fann Mountains (2006) 
Tigrovaya Balka (2006) 
Zakaznik Kusavlisay (2006) 
State reserve Dashti Djum (2006) 
Zorkul State Reserve (2006)
Silk Roads Sites in Tajikistan (2013)

See also
Tourism in Tajikistan
List of World Heritage Sites in Northern and Central Asia

References

T
 List
World Heritage Sites